The Pacific Electric Railroad Bridge or Southern Pacific Railroad Bridge now officially named the "Pacific Electric Railway- El Prado Bridge" is a historic double-tracked arch bridge located in Torrance, California USA, spanning Torrance Boulevard at Bow Avenue, a short distance west of Western Avenue.  It was once part of the north/south San Pedro via Gardena Line of the Pacific Electric Railway, that agency's first interurban line to San Pedro.

Torrance, California is a town that was planned on the drawing board. Before 1912 there was no settlement in the area.

After splitting off to the east from the Union Tool Company plant which was once a short distance south of the bridge, the line terminated at the new Torrance plant of the Llewellyn Iron Works which was opened in 1916. It ran up and over the railroad's east/west Torrance local line in much the same manner as a viaduct and is the only part of the PE which crossed itself in such a manner; indeed, the map on the following reference link refers to the bridge as a viaduct.  This was due to the area's geography; simply building a spur off of the main line would have resulted in too steep a climb to the steel mill.  The steel mill has since been demolished to make way for the national headquarters of American Honda Motor Company, but the once double-tracked Torrance line was reballasted and rerailed with used welded rail in 2003 and is still in use for local runs by the Union Pacific Railroad.  Gone too are the Pacific Electric's Torrance shops at the western branch of the split, now the site of an industrial park still serviced by the aforementioned local line.

Designed by Irving Gill and built in 1913 as part of the original layout of the city as determined by Jared Sidney Torrance and Frederick Law Olmsted, Jr., the bridge became the city's second entry in the National Register of Historic Places on July 13, 1989 after Torrance High School.  It is also listed with the California Office of Historic Preservation.

The Pacific Electric Railway- El Prado Bridge, was dedicated as a Local Engineering Landmark by the American Society of Civil Engineers in 2013.

Though trackage, turnouts and remnants of a switch remain on the bridge, it is no longer in use nor has it been for quite some time.  There is no chance of the bridge returning to service, since the right-of-way at either end has been redeveloped.  Nevertheless, the Pacific Electric Railroad Bridge has become a symbol of the city as part of the Torrance Police Department's logo as of January 1, 2000, only the third such change in the department's history.

See also
 List of bridges on the National Register of Historic Places in California
 National Register of Historic Places listings in Los Angeles County, California

References

External links

Map and satellite view of the bridge at Archiplanet.org
Modern photos of the bridge including the tracks at Reprise.com 

Bridges in Los Angeles County, California
Buildings and structures in Torrance, California
Pacific Electric infrastructure
Railroad bridges in California
Former railway bridges in the United States
Bridges completed in 1913
Railroad bridges on the National Register of Historic Places in California
Buildings and structures on the National Register of Historic Places in Los Angeles County, California
1913 establishments in California
Concrete bridges in California
Irving Gill buildings
Modernist architecture in California
Arch bridges in the United States